Alexandru Meszaros (26 May 1933 - 4 August 2016) was a Romanian footballer who played as a striker.

International career
Alexandru Meszaros played two games for Romania's Olympic team at the 1960 Summer Olympics qualifiers.

Honours
Steagul Roșu Brașov
Balkans Cup: 1960–61

Notes

References

External links

Alexandru Meszaros manager profile at Labtof.ro

1933 births
2016 deaths
Romanian footballers
Olympic footballers of Romania
Association football forwards
Liga I players
Liga II players
FC Brașov (1936) players
Romanian football managers
FC Brașov (1936) managers
Sportspeople from Târgu Mureș